Le Raincy is a prestigious commune in the eastern suburbs of Paris, France. Le Raincy is a subprefecture of the Seine-Saint-Denis department and the seat of the Arrondissement of Le Raincy.

Its population is small relative to surrounding communes, just under 15,000. However, its development as an administrative centre, along with the establishment over the years of several schools, gives it more prominence than its population size would suggest.

Its character has made it known as le Neuilly de la Seine-Saint-Denis.

History
In the 17th and 18th century, Raincy was known primarily as location of the Château du Raincy, now demolished. The commune of Le Raincy was created on 20 May 1869 by detaching a part of the territory of Livry-Gargan and merging it with a part of the territory of Clichy-sous-Bois and a small part of the territory of Gagny.

Heraldry

Population

Notre-Dame du Raincy

The town today receives visitors - mainly to see the Notre-Dame du Raincy church. Designed by the brothers Auguste and Gustave Perret and built in 1922–1923, this was one of the first churches to be built in reinforced concrete, and with no external ornamentation. The architecture is remarkable for the classicism of its columns, greatly enhanced by the stained glass windows of Maurice Denis and Marie-Alain Couturier.  The church is listed as an historic monument. It was restored in the 1990s, and is in regular use. Many of the visitors to the church come from Japan, as a smaller replica of Notre Dame du Raincy was built in the Tokyo suburbs.

Transport
Le Raincy is served by Le Raincy – Villemomble – Montfermeil station on Paris RER line E.

Education
Secondary schools:
 Junior high school: Collège Jean-Baptiste Corot
 Senior high schools/sixth-form colleges:
Lycée René Cassin
Lycée Albert Schweitzer

Twin towns
Le Raincy is twinned with:
  London Borough of Barnet, United Kingdom
  Clusone, Italy
  Yavne, Israel

See also
Communes of the Seine-Saint-Denis department

References

External links

 Home page 
 
 Notre-Dame du Raincy at greatbuildings.com
  The Raincy blog

Communes of Seine-Saint-Denis
Subprefectures in France